Voluntown is a town in New London County, Connecticut, United States. The population was 2,570 at the 2020 census. Voluntown was part of Windham County from 1726 to 1881.

The town was named for the English volunteers in the 1675 Indian wars (King Philip's War) who stayed to fight "and went not away". One of the original founders of Voluntown was Lieutenant Thomas Leffingwell, who secured the town's approval in the colonial legislature and surveyed its original layout. Maj. General Benedict Arnold, the infamous Revolutionary War turncoat was a landholder.

Geography

Demographics

At the 2000 census there were 2,528 people, 952 households, and 702 families living in the town. The racial makeup of the town was 96.64% White, 0.55% African American, 0.99% Native American, 0.28% Asian, 0.40% from other races, and 1.15% from two or more races. Hispanic or Latino of any race were 1.19%. 13.2% were of English, 12.5% French Canadian, 11.5% Irish, 9.2% American, 8.9% French, 8.0% Polish, 7.6% Italian, 7.3% German and 5.6% Finnish ancestry according to Census 2000.

Of the 952 households 37.4% had children under the age of 18 living with them, 61.9% were married couples living together, 7.0% had a female householder with no husband present, and 26.2% were non-families. 19.0% of households were one person and 6.3% were one person aged 65 or older.  The average household size was 2.66 and the average family size was 3.05.

The age distribution was 26.5% under the age of 18, 5.3% from 18 to 24, 36.9% from 25 to 44, 21.7% from 45 to 64, and 9.5% 65 or older.  The median age was 36 years. For every 100 females, there were 104.2 males.  For every 100 females age 18 and over, there were 105.6 males.

The median household income was $56,802 and the median family income  was $61,618. Males had a median income of $42,647 versus $27,368 for females. The per capita income for the town was $23,707.  About 3.0% of families and 4.9% of the population were below the poverty line, including 4.7% of those under age 18 and 10.3% of those age 65 or over.

Education
There is only one school in the school district. Voluntown Elementary School offers grades pre-k through 8th and has offered full-day kindergarten since the 2008–2009 school year. The school also offers a program for three-year-old children. In-town high school students are given the option of attending one of two public schools: Griswold High School or Norwich Free Academy. They are also given the choice of selecting a technical school: Norwich Tech or Ellis Tech. Students can also attend Quinebaug Middle College at Q.V.C.C. in Danielson, CT, and Marine Science Magnet High School in Groton, CT.

Institutions
Voluntown is the home of the Voluntown Peace Trust, successor to the New England Committee for Non-Violent Action, which opposed nuclear weapons testing and the launch of nuclear submarines from nearby Groton during the 1950s and 1960s.

External links

Town of Voluntown official website
Voluntown Elementary School
Pachaug State Forest

References

 
Towns in New London County, Connecticut
Towns in Connecticut
1721 establishments in Connecticut